Curbridge is a village in Hampshire, England.

Governance
The village is part of the civil parish of Curdridge and is part of the Owslebury and Curdridge ward of the City of Winchester non-metropolitan district, in the Meon Valley division of Hampshire County Council.

References

Villages in Hampshire